Şehzadeler is a new intracity district and second level municipality in Manisa Province, Turkey. According to Law act no 6360, all Turkish provinces with a population more than 750000, were declared metropolitan municipality. The law also created new  districts within the capital city  which have second level municipalities in addition the metropolitan municipality. . Şehzadeler is one of them.

Thus after 2014 Manisa central district was split into two.
A part was  named Şehzadeler and the name Manisa was reserved for the metropolitan municipality. (Şehzadeler means "princes" referring to those princes who served as sanjak rulers in Manisa during the Ottoman Empire period)

Rural area
There are 9 towns and 23 villages in the rural area of Şehzadeler district. Now their official status became "neighborhood of Şehzadeler".

References

 
Manisa